Pterodactylus giganteus is a scientific name which has been used for at least three distinct species of pterosaurs previously classified in the genus Pterodactylus. It may refer to:

 "Pterodactylus" giganteus (Oken, 1819): Originally Ornithocephalus giganteus, currently considered a synonym of Rhamphorhynchus muensteri
 "Pterodactylus" giganteus (Morris, 1854): A synonym of Cimoliornis diomedeus
 "Pterodactylus" giganteus (Bowerbank, 1846): Now Lonchodraco giganteus

Pterodactyloids